The Pauaquachin (formerly Pak-quw-chin) are a Coast Salish indigenous people whose territory is in the Greater Victoria area of southern Vancouver Island, British Columbia, Canada. Their houses stand between Gordon Head and Cowichan Head. They are one of the five groups of houses or 'families' of Saanich, along with the Tsawout, the Tseycum, the Malahat, the T'sou-ke, and the Tsartlip First Nations. According to a 2016 census, 330 people were recognized as Pauquachin.

Speakers of North Straits Salish, they were organized by the Indian Act into the Pauquachin First Nation. The Pauquachin are members of the Te'Mexw Treaty Association, which conducts treaty negotiations with the governments of Canada and British Columbia for several tribes.

History 

According to the Pauquachin First Nations, the population in Pauquachin began as a small group of 14 families.

Contract with the Hudson's Bay Company 
In 1852m, Governor James Douglas made two treaties with the Saanich people. He concluded one with the southern Saanich, ie with Pauquachin and Malahat, on February 6, 1852 - signed by Whut-say mullet and nine other people - and one on February 11 with the northern Saanich. In exchange for several hundred blankets, this treaty was the basis for taking their land from them.

Reservations 
The Pauquachin hold title to and live on three reservations on the Saanich Inlet south of Mill Bay and in the Goldstream and Highlands Districts at the southern end of the Finlayson Arm and at the mouth of the Goldstream River– Coles Bay (Indian Reserve #3), Hatch Point (Indian Reserve #12), and Goldstream (Indian Reserve #13), with the Goldstream reserve claim being shared along with the Malahat, Tsartlip, Tsawout and Tseycum First Nations for traditional fishing purposes.  All on-reserve Pauquachin members reside on the Coles Bay reserve where residential, cultural, and administrative buildings are available.

The reservations were established in 1877 as part of the Douglas Treaties on Southern Vancouver Island, which were a colonial policy that recognized indigenous possession of land.

Destruction of land 
In 1996, officials determined that the decades-long conversion of the region around the Saanich Inlet had led to massive destruction. A 1997 study of cultural development found similar results. These investigations were related to the Bamberton Town Development Project, a development project adjacent to the Malahat area, a project with far-reaching ecological and hence cultural implications. A project was developed under the auspices of the Environmental Assessment Office, which was to take into account the demands of the six tribes concerned, i.e. the Malahat, Tsartlip , Pauquachin, Tseycum and Tsawout Bands, and the Cowichan Tribes. The report outlined the traditional and current uses of the affected land. The experiences from this led to the protection of various areas in the newly created city and culminated in 1998 in the participation of the indigenous people in the development of marine protection areas.

See also 

 History of the Coast Salish
 History of British Columbia
 History of the First Nations

References 

 

Coast Salish
First Nations in British Columbia
Greater Victoria